Jane Robbins may refer to: 

 Jane Robbins, (born 1962) British sculptor
Jane D. Robbins (1919 - 2008), American Compton City councillor